The Cummins Aeos is a concept electric-powered semi-truck tractor unit, an Urban Hauler Tractor, designed by Cummins. The vehicle is named after Aeos, the flying horse, one of four, of Greek mythology that pulled the chariot of the god Helios across the sky; and the Sun with it. It is the first fully electric heavy-duty truck revealed to the public, and the first electric model from Cummins. The aerodynamic semi truck body was designed by Cummins partner Roush Industries, while Cummins focused on the battery and driveline systems.

Specifications
The Aeos is an  short-haul day-cab two-axle Class 7 tractor unit (prime-mover). The Li-ion battery is to have a 1-hour recharge time. It is equipped with regenerative braking and low rolling resistance tires to maximize the range. An option for a range extender engine (the Cummins B4.5 or B6.7 motors) could be added for additional range. Solar panels can be equipped onto the trailer to increase range.

Production
Production was slated for 2019, with OEM production partners, and not by Cummins itself. Cummins was said to provide battery and driveline systems to its production partners. As of March 2021, there is no mention of this vehicle on the Cummins website.

See also
 Proterra, Inc., U.S. electric bus manufacturer
 Nikola Motor Company, U.S. electric semi rig manufacturer, and also utility vehicles
 Toyota Project Portal class 8 fuel-cell truck
 Tesla Semi class 8 battery-electric tractor unit
 Freightliner eCascadia class 8 battery-electric tractor variant of conventional truck

References

Aeos
Trucks of the United States
Electric trucks
Battery electric vehicles
Electric concept cars